Melody Teo (born 2 July 1991) is a Singaporean netball player who represents Singapore internationally since 2008 and plays in the positions of goal keeper, goal defense or wing defense. She was part of the Singaporean squad at the 2019 Netball World Cup, which was also her first World Cup appearance. 

Melody was also a member of the Singaporean contingent which bagged silver at the 2017 Southeast Asian Games.

In September 2019, she was included in the Singaporean squad for the 2019 M1 Nations Cup.

References 

1991 births
Living people
Singaporean netball players
Southeast Asian Games silver medalists for Singapore
Southeast Asian Games medalists in netball
Competitors at the 2017 Southeast Asian Games
Competitors at the 2019 Southeast Asian Games
2019 Netball World Cup players
Singaporean sportspeople of Chinese descent
21st-century Singaporean women